Zerconidae is a family of mites in the order Mesostigmata.

Species

Acoesejus Selinick, 1941
Acoesejus muricatus (C.L.Koch, 1839)
Aleksozercon A. D. Petrova, 1978
Aleksozercon zachvatkini A. D. Petrova, 1978
Amerozercon Halasková, 1969
Amerozercon suspiciosus Halasková, 1969
Aquilonozercon V. Halasková, 1979
Aquilonozercon desuetus V. Halasková, 1979
Bakeras C. Blaszak, 1984
Bakeras opiparus C. Blaszak, 1984
Blaszakzercon Kemal & Kocak, 2009
Blaszakzercon pulcher (C. Blaszak, 1984)
Carpathozercon P. G. Balan, 1991
Carpathozercon longiperitrematus P. G. Balan, 1991
Caurozercon Halasková, 1977
Caurozercon duplex 
Caurozercon duplexoideus Ma, 2002
Caurozercon similis Petrova, 1979
Caurozercon smirnovi Petrova, 1979
Caurozercon triplex Petrova, 1979
Cosmozercon C. Blaszak, 1981
Cosmozercon setosus C. Blaszak, 1981
Echinozercon C. Blaszak, 1975
Echinozercon americanus Blaszak, 1982
Echinozercon orientalis C. Blaszak, 1975
Eurozercon V. Halasková, 1979
Eurozercon aquilonis V. Halasková, 1979
Eurozercon pacificus Halaskova, 1979
Hypozercon C. Blaszak, 1981
Hypozercon macleani C. Blaszak, 1981
Indozercon C. Blaszak, 1978
Indozercon janinae C. Blaszak, 1978
Kaikiozercon V. Halasková, 1979
Kaikiozercon mamillosus Halaskova, 1979
Kaikiozercon peregrinus V. Halasková, 1979
Koreozercon V. Halasková, 1979
Koreozercon bacatus V. Halasková, 1979
Krantzas C. Blaszak, 1981
Krantzas mirificus C. Blaszak, 1981
Lindquistas C. Blaszak, 1981
Lindquistas amythetes C. Blaszak, 1981
Macrozercon Blaszak, 1975
Macrozercon praecipuus (Sellnick, 1958)
Mesozercon Blaszak, 1975
Mesozercon coreanus Blaszak, 1975
Mesozercon dunhuaensis Ma, 2003
Mesozercon plumatus (Aoki, 1966)
Metazercon Blaszak, 1975
Metazercon athiasae Blaszak, 1975
Metazercon mahunkai Halaskova, 1979
Metazercon rafalskii Blaszak, Kaczmarek & Joon-Ho-Le, 1997
Microzercon Blaszak, 1975
Microzercon californicus (Sellnick, 1958)
Mixozercon Halasková, 1963
Mixozercon heterosetosus Balan, 1995
Mixozercon sellnicki (Schweizer, 1948)
Monozercon C. Blaszak, 1984
Monozercon aciculatus C. Blaszak, 1984
Neozercon Petrova, 1977
Neozercon evgenii Petrova, 1978
Neozercon insularis Petrova, 1977
Neozercon smirnovi Petrova, 1978
Paleozercon Blaszak, Cokendolpher & Polyak, 1995
Paleozercon cavernicolus Blaszak, Cokendolpher & Polyak, 1995
Parazercon Trägårdh, 1931
Parazercon floralis Ma, 2002
Parazercon ornatus (Berlese, 1903)
Parazercon sergienkoae Balan, 1991
Parhozercon C. Blaszak, 1981
Parhozercon medialis C. Blaszak, 1981
Polonozercon C. Blaszak, 1979
Polonozercon tatrensis (Blaszak, 1974)
Prozercon Sellnick, 1943
Prozercon achaeanus Ujvari, 2011
Prozercon artvinensis Urhan & Ayyildiz, 1996
Prozercon bircanae Urhan, 1998
Prozercon boyacii Urhan & Ayyildiz, 1996
Prozercon bulbiferus Ujvari, 2011
Prozercon cambriensis Skorupski & Luxton, 1996
Prozercon carpathicus Balan & Sergienko, 1990
Prozercon carsticus Halaskova, 1963
Prozercon changbaiensis Bei, Shi & Yin, 2002
Prozercon demirsoyi Urhan & Ayyildiz, 1996
Prozercon denizliensis Urhan, 2002
Prozercon dominiaki Blaszak, 1979
Prozercon dramaensis Ujvari, 2011
Prozercon escalai Moraza, 1990
Prozercon fimbriatus (C.L.Koch, 1839)
Prozercon graecus Ujvari, 2011
Prozercon juanensis Moraza, 1990
Prozercon kafkasoricus Urhan, 1998
Prozercon kamili Urhan & Ayyildiz, 1996
Prozercon kochi Sellnick, 1943
Prozercon kunsti Halaskova, 1963
Prozercon kurui Urhan, 1998
Prozercon luxtoni Urhan & Ayyildiz, 1996
Prozercon mersinensis Urhan, 1998
Prozercon micherdzinskii Blaszak, 1978
Prozercon morazae Ujvari, 2011
Prozercon norae Ujvari, 2011
Prozercon orhani Urhan & Ayyildiz, 1996
Prozercon ornatus (Berlese, 1904)
Prozercon rafalskii Blaszak, 1971
Prozercon satapliae Petrova, 1977
Prozercon similis Balan, 1992
Prozercon tellecheai Moraza, 1990
Prozercon traegardhi (Halbert, 1923)
Prozercon traegardhisimilis Solomon, 1984
Prozercon turcicus Urhan & Ayyildiz, 1996
Prozercon ukrainicus Balan, 1991
Prozercon umidicola Urhan, 2002
Prozercon usheri Blaszak, 1985
Prozercon yavuzi Urhan, 1998
Rafas C. Blaszak, 1979
Rafas bisternalis C. Blaszak, 1979
Rafas blaszaki Urhan & Ayyildiz, 1996
Skeironozercon Halasková, 1977
Skeironozercon embersoni Halaskova, 1977
Skeironozercon tricavus Blaszak, 1982
Syskenozercon Athias-Henriot, 1977
Syskenozercon kosiri Athias-Henriot, 1977
Triangulazercon Jacot, 1938
Triangulazercon peltatus (C.L.Koch, 1836)
Trizerconoides Jacot, 1938
Trizerconoides radiatus (Berlese, 1910)
Xenozercon Blaszak, 1976
Xenozercon glaber Blaszak, 1976
Zercon C.L.Koch, 1836
Zercon acanticus Blaszak, 1978
Zercon acrochordus (Blaszak, 1979)
Zercon adoxellus Blaszak, 1978
Zercon adoxyphes Blaszak, 1979
Zercon agnostus Blaszak, 1979
Zercon amidrytus Blaszak, 1978
Zercon amphibolus Blaszak, 1978
Zercon andrei Sellnick, 1958
Zercon aniellae Solomon, 1984
Zercon apladellus Blaszak
Zercon asaphus Blaszak, 1976
Zercon asymmetricus Balan, 1991
Zercon athiasi Vincze, 1965
Zercon austriacus Sellnick, 1959
Zercon ayyildizi Urhan, 1997
Zercon bajcalensis Blaszak, 1979
Zercon balearicus Athias Henriot, 1961
Zercon beleviensis Urhan, 2002
Zercon berlesei Sellnick, 1958
Zercon bisetosus Balan, 1995
Zercon blaszaki Solomon, 1982
Zercon brachysetosus Balan, 1992
Zercon bulgaricus Balogh, 1961
Zercon burdurensis Urhan, 2001
Zercon caenolestes Blaszak, 1976
Zercon capillatus Berlese, 1914
Zercon caucasicus Blaszak, 1979
Zercon cazorlensis Athias Henriot, 1961
Zercon colligans Berlese, 1920
Zercon comaliatus Blaszak, 1978
Zercon crinitus Berlese, 1920
Zercon delicatus Urhan & Ekiz, 2002
Zercon disparipila Athias Henriot, 1961
Zercon dzobavi Balan & Vinnik, 1993
Zercon echinatus Schweizer, 1922
Zercon embersoni Blaszak, 1985
Zercon encarpatus Athias Henriot, 1961
Zercon forliensis Sellnick, 1944
Zercon forsslundi Sellnick, 1958
Zercon foveolatus Halaskova, 1969
Zercon fragilis Urhan, 2001
Zercon franzi (Willmann, 1943)
Zercon furcatus G. Canestrini & Fanzago, 1876
Zercon gerhardi Halaskova, 1979
Zercon heilongjiangensis Ma & Yin, 1999
Zercon hemimbricatus Skorupski & Luxton, 1996
Zercon henoticus Blaszak, 1979
Zercon hibericus Mihelcic, 1960
Zercon hispanicus Sellnick, 1958
Zercon ignobilis Blaszak, 1979
Zercon incompletus Balan, 1995
Zercon indiscretus Blaszak, 1979
Zercon inornatus Willmann, 1943
Zercon insperatus Blaszak, 1979
Zercon italicus Sellnick, 1944
Zercon jammicus Blaszak, 1979
Zercon jilinensis Ma, 2003
Zercon kackaricus Urhan & Ekiz, 2002
Zercon karadaghiensis Balan, 1992
Zercon kashmiricus Blaszak, 1979
Zercon kaszabi Blaszak, 1978
Zercon kosovina Kontschán, 2006
Zercon latissimus Sellnick, 1944
Zercon leitnerae Willmann, 1953
Zercon lepurus Blaszak, 1979
Zercon lindrothi Lundqvist & Johnston, 1985
Zercon mahunkai Blaszak, 1978
Zercon michejdai Blaszak, 1979
Zercon moldavicus Calugar, 1997
Zercon mongolicus Blaszak, 1978
Zercon montanus Willmann, 1943
Zercon mucronatus G. Canestrini & Fanzago, 1876
Zercon navarrensis Moraza, 1989
Zercon nemoralis Urhan, 2001
Zercon notabilis Blaszak, 1979
Zercon ovalis Balan, 1992
Zercon ozkani Urhan & Ayyildiz, 1993
Zercon parivus Moraza, 1991
Zercon perforatulus Berlese, 1904
Zercon pinicola Halaskova, 1969
Zercon plumatopilus Athias-Henriot, 1961
Zercon polonicus Blaszak, 1970
Zercon ponticus Balan, 1991
Zercon prasadi Blaszak, 1979
Zercon quadricavum Urhan, 2001
Zercon rafaljanus Błaszak & Łaniecka, 2007
Zercon reticulatus Ramadan, 1997
Zercon rhoi Valle, 1965
Zercon rigidus Blaszak, 1979
Zercon romagniolus Sellnick, 1944
Zercon rupestrinus Blaszak, 1979
Zercon salebrosus Blaszak, 1979
Zercon salmani Urhan, 2002
Zercon saphenus Blaszak, 1979
Zercon sarasinorum Schweizer, 1949
Zercon schrammi Blaszak, 1979
Zercon secundus Blaszak, 1979
Zercon separatus Urhan, 2001
Zercon septemporus Urhan, 2001
Zercon serenoides Blaszak & Polanska, 1998
Zercon serenus Halaskova, 1970
Zercon serratus Urhan, 2001
Zercon shcherbakae Balan, 1994
Zercon similis Sellnick, 1958
Zercon sklari Balan, 1992
Zercon solenites Haarlov, 1942
Zercon sonamargus Blaszak, 1979
Zercon spatulatus Koch, 1839
Zercon srinagaricus Blaszak, 1979
Zercon storkani Halaskova, 1969
Zercon sylvii Solomon, 1982
Zercon szeptyckii Blaszak, 1976
Zercon tarpanicus Blaszak, 1979
Zercon tauricus Balan, 1991
Zercon trabzonensis Urhan, 1997
Zercon triangularis C.L.Koch, 1836
Zercon turcicus Urhan & Ayyildiz, 1993
Zercon villosus Blaszak & Polanska, 1998
Zercon wisniewskii Blaszak & Skorupski, 1992
Zercon xiaoxinganlingensis Ma & Yin, 1999
Zercon zangherii Sellnick, 1944
Zercon zelawaiensis Sellnick, 1944

References

Zerconidae
Acari families